WKD may refer to:

Warszawska Kolej Dojazdowa, a light railway in Warsaw, Poland
WKD Original Vodka, an alcopop
World Kidney Day
World Kindness Day, an international observance held on 13 November each year